Krhanice is a municipality and village in Benešov District in the Central Bohemian Region of the Czech Republic. It has about 1,000 inhabitants.

Administrative parts
Villages of Dolní Požáry and Prosečnice are administrative parts of Krhanice.

Geography
It lies in the Benešov Uplands, on the right bank of the Sázava River.

History
The first written mention of Krhanice is from 1228.

Notable people
Jiří Hájek (1913–1993), politician and diplomat
Otakar Brousek Sr. (1924–2014), actor

References

Villages in Benešov District